State Route 5 (SR 5) is an east–west state highway in the northeastern portion of the U.S. state of Ohio.

Route description

State Route 5 (SR 5) is an east–west state highway in the northeastern portion of the U.S. state of Ohio. Its western terminus is at Interstate 76 at its interchange with State Route 44 about 3.5 miles (5.6 km) south of Ravenna, and its eastern terminus is at the Pennsylvania state line northeast of Kinsman; this point is also the western terminus of Pennsylvania Route 58 which begins to the east.

History

1932 – Current route established; originally routed along the former State Route 36 from Wooster to the Pennsylvania state line along current State Route 585, State Route 59, its current routing east of Ravenna, and a currently unnumbered road through Akron.
1978 – Warren Bypass upgraded to freeway.

Before 1932
1929 – State Route 5 dual certification removed from U.S. Route 42 and State Route 6.
1932 – Delphos to Mansfield certified as U.S. Route 30N.

Major intersections

References

External links

State Route 5 Endpoint Photos

005
Ohio State Route 005
Ohio State Route 005